Ujoni Majuli is the upper part of Majuli, Assam. It is also called Upper Majuli.

See also
Madhya Majuli
Namoni Majuli
List of educational institutes in Majuli

External links

Geography of Assam
Majuli
Majuli district